Olive Branch was launched in 1777 in America, possibly under a different name. In 1788–1789 she made one voyage as a whaler in the British Southern Whale Fishery. On her return she traded with Gibraltar and the Mediterranean. She was last listed in 1793.

Career
On 3 February she sailed from Cowes for the Southern Fishery.

She was coming from the Brazils, having been at the Cape three weeks earlier. She was leaky but not in need of anything. On 24 April 1789 she arrived at Gravesend from Lisbon. She had put into Lisbon in January on her way back from the South Seas. Olive Branch returned with 50 tuns of whale oil and 30 cwt of whale bone.

Olive Branch first appeared in Lloyd's Register (LR) in 1789. (The volume for 1788 is not available online, if it exists, and Olive Branch did not appear in the 1787 volume.) LR showed Olive Branchs master as W. Lucas, and her trade as London–Southern Fishery. However, there is no evidence in the Lloyd's List ship arrival and departure ((SAD) data of any such voyage.

The 1790 volume showed Olive Branchs master changing to Clark, and her trade to London–Gibraltar. On 15 April 1790 she sailed from Gravesend for Gibraltar; by May she was reported to be at Gibraltar. By 14 August she was at Terravecchia. 

On 4 August 1789, the snow Olive Branch, of "One Hundred Tons or thereabouts", lying at Mr. Oliver's dock at Warping Will was offered for sale by auction at Lloyd's Coffee House, pursuant to a decree by the High Court of Admiralty.

Fate
Olive Branch was last listed in 1793.

It is possible that the Admiralty purchased her for use as the fire ship , of 103 tons (bm).

Citations and references
Citations

References
 

1777 ships
Age of Sail merchant ships of England
Whaling ships